Nosotros somos Dios, literally translated "We Are God", is a play by Mexican playwright Wilberto Cantón (1923–1979).  Published in 1962 and written in Spanish, it portrays the troubles of the Alvarez family during the turbulent time of the Mexican Revolution of 1910.

Characters
The characters in the play are, in order of appearance:
 Clara
 Laura
 Carlos
 Don Justo
 Luisito or Luis
 Criado
 Coronel Páez
 Octavio
 Capitán Aguirre

Don Justo and Clara are the heads of the Alvarez family, and parents of Carlos, Laura, and Luis. Eventually Octavio enters the Alvarez family by marrying Laura. Luis is the youngest of the children, being nine years old at the start of the play, Carlos is eighteen and Laura is the oldest at about twenty years old. The Criado works for the Alvarez family.

Nosotros somos Dios is known in the United States as a play often read by students of Spanish.  The play was published in a United States edition designed specifically for students, with an introduction in English and an appendix of Spanish exercises.

Plot
Clara and Don Justo struggle with their children as they have modern ideas against the conservative ideas of their parents. Don Justo works in the government as the Minister to Victoriano Huerta, president of Mexico at the time. Carlos is influenced by his more left-wing friends and disagrees with his parents' ideology. Laura's parents want her to marry Milito Carral, but she loves Octavio Galvez, a well-educated lawyer and revolutionary. Luisito, the youngest son, tries to run away from home because he is "afraid of Don Justo." Clara and Don Justo send him off to boarding school because of his reckless habits.

Don Justo, the Minister to Victoriano Huerta, starts to throw the revolutionaries into jail after they have a manifestation in the Casa de Obrero Mundial. Many of these revolutionaries are friends of Carlos's, such as Jorge, Diana, and Horacio. Don Justo demands that his accomplice Paez torture the prisoners to discover the leaders of the manifestation. In the end, Don Justo orders their execution. Carlos is angry with his father because he agrees with the people that his father killed. Diana was Carlos' girlfriend and Carlos at one time says that he "wanted to marry her."

When Venustiano Carranza overthrows Huerta, Don Justo is forced into hiding. Octavio becomes "Subsecretario de Justicia" or "Secretary of Justice" in the government. After Don Justo leaves, Laura and Octavio get married and Laura soon becomes pregnant. Clara is upset because her husband is gone, but she continues to keep the children together. Luisito, who has come back from boarding school, is still scared that he is going to get sent back.

After 3 months, Don Justo returns to his family and house. Before any of the family members have seen him, Don Justo goes around the house and sees the changes that have occurred. He sees a picture of Carranza along with a picture of Octavio and Laura's wedding. It makes Don Justo upset for not being there. While Don Justo looks at these pictures, Octavio and Carlos are visited by Captain Aguirre, a member of Carranza's army and friend of Carlos. Captain Aguirre has come to the house with a search warrant. The government believes that Don Justo is hiding in the house, and that he is storing weapons for the counterrevolution. The Captain is friends with Carlos and Octavio and will not search the house.

Later that night, Don Justo spawns near Carlos and the rest of the family. They debate what to do with Don Justo, and consider that Octavio could write him a pass to safety (salvoconducto) to leave Mexico. Octavio says that it is his "obligation as a man" to save Don Justo but his "responsibility as a revolutionary" to turn him in. Carlos is angry and threatens to turn in Don Justo on the spot, and runs out of the room. Clara begs Octavio to write him the pass, but Octavio is reluctant because he could be killed if the government were to find out. Laura wants Octavio to do it because she thinks that if Octavio doesn't love her father that he can't love their child. Eventually, Octavio agrees to write the pass. Carlos is still gone and Clara thinks Carlos turned in Don Justo, but when Carlos returns the police are not with him. Carlos and Don Justo talk and Carlos tells him how upset he has been with him after Diana was killed. He fills Don Justo in on what he missed while he was gone and informs him of Laura's pregnancy. Carlos eventually changes his mind and asks Don Justo to accept the pass. Octavio's only condition is that Don Justo leaves Mexico and never comes back. Don Justo refuses this proposition and says he "cannot betray those who trust in him" and that it is "too late to change his life."

The story ends with Don Justo anonymously calling Captain Aguirre and telling him "It would be useless to tell you my name. The lawyer Don Justo del Prado, enemy of the public, will be detained for 10 minutes in the entrance of his old house. Be careful with him. He is armed." Don Justo speaks with each member of his family, telling them he loves them and complimenting them on their strengths. He gives Clara a letter to present to Octavio saying that he "died so the new Mexico, strong and free, could be born", speaking of both Laura's child and Mexico itself. As he walks out of the building, shots ring out and he dies.

Following Don Justo's death, Octavio discovers the letter and reads it to the family, and the curtain closes.

References

Cantón, Wilberto (1962).  Nosotros somos Dios: Pieza en Dos Actos. Ed. S. Samuel Trifilo and Luis Soto-Ruiz. Harper & Row, New York.  Library of Congress Catalog Card Number: 66-11272

1962 plays